Johnson Draw, also formerly known as Johnsons Run and Johnson Creek, is a tributary of the Devils River in Val Verde County, Texas.

See also
List of rivers of Texas

References

USGS Geographic Names Information Service
USGS Hydrologic Unit Map - State of Texas (1974)

Devils River (Texas)
Rivers of Val Verde County, Texas
Bodies of water of Crockett County, Texas
San Antonio–El Paso Road
Rivers of Texas